Buffet Crampon SAS is a French manufacturer of wind instruments based in Mantes-la-Ville, Yvelines department. The company is the world market leader in the production of clarinets of the Boehm system. Its subsidiary, Buffet Crampon Deutschland GmbH, founded in 2010 and based in Markneukirchen, Vogtland, Sachsen, is the world market leader in the manufacture of brass instruments. To manufacture and sell its products, the BC Group employed around 1000 people worldwide at the beginning of 2021, 470 of them as employees of BC Germany alone. The management of the group has been in the hands of Jérôme Perrod since 2014.

Products and brands 
The following brands / labels, with the exception of the Buffet Crampon brand, are formerly independent companies whose essential assets, including the name and trademark rights, are owned by other companies and ultimately were acquired partly by Buffet Crampon SAS partly by BC Deutschland GmbH, and which were then dissolved as companies.

The Buffet Crampon SAS has six brands under which it manufactures the following instruments.

 Buffet Crampon: Clarinets with a French fingering system (Boehm), namely (almost) the entire clarinet family in tunings from high E to contralto, also oboes, English horns, bassoons (with French fingering and drilling) and saxophones
 Rigoutat: Oboes, English horns, oboes d'amore and baritone oboes
 Parmenon: transverse flutes
 Verne Q. Powell: Flutes and piccolos
 Antoine Courtois:  trombones, flugelhorns and saxhorns
 Besson:  trumpets, trombones, cornets, alto horns, tenor horns, baritone horns,  euphoniums and tubas in E and B
BC Deutschland also has six brands under which the following instruments are manufactured.

 B&S: Trumpets, trombones, cornets, flugelhorns, tenor horns, baritone horns and tubas
 Hans Hoyer: Simple horns, double horns, triple horns, descant horns and Wagner tubas
 Melton Meinl Weston: flugelhorns, baritone and tenor horns, bass trumpets, tubas and cimbassos
 J.Scherzer: B and C trumpets and high trumpets
 W. Schreiber: Clarinets in B and C (one model) with German fingering (Oehler), bassoons and contrabassoons
 Julius Keilwerth: Saxophones (soprano, alto, tenor, baritone and bass)

Production and sales 

The BC group of companies has six production sites in which they manufacture the following instruments.

 in Mantes-la-Ville: professional clarinets, oboes, French bassoons
 in Markneukirchen: all brass instruments of the Buffet Crampon Group are manufactured in the two factories there, with the exception of the Besson student instruments and the "high end" instruments of the Melton Meinl Weston brand, as well as student clarinets of the Buffet Crampon brand and all instruments of the brands W.Schreiber and J. Keilwerth.
 in Geretsried: near Munich: the instruments of the brand Melton Meinl Weston (R&D center for all brass instruments of the group)
 in Peking: brass instruments for beginners
 in Shanghai: woodwind instruments for beginners
 in Maynard: Massachusetts: VQPowell flutes

BC has sales companies in the United States, Canada, Japan and the Netherlands. It also has six showrooms: in Paris, Geretsried near Munich, Amsterdam, Jacksonville, Tokyo and Beijing.

History 

Denis Buffet-Auger, of the Buffet family of French musical instrument makers, began making quality clarinets in Paris, France in 1825. The company expanded under Jean-Louis Buffet and his wife Zoé Crampon and became known as BUFFET Crampon & Cie a Paris (BC). (Another family member, Auguste Buffet jeune, who worked with famous clarinetist Hyacinthe Klosé to develop the Boehm system for clarinet, had his own business separate from BC.)

In 1850, BC established its headquarters at Mantes-la-Ville. The company continued to expand its range and quality in instrument production, beginning saxophone production in 1866, and winning numerous awards.

In 1877 BC acquired the Evette & Schaeffer Company and began to use that name as their instrument brand. In 1887 BC obtained a patent for a mechanism to control an extra key on an extended saxophone bell, extending the lower range from B to B.  In 1908 BC began exporting instruments to the US. In 1910 BC introduced the Apogee premium model saxophone, which had innovative keywork features that were later adapted by other manufacturers. In 1918 BC began marketing their premium line instruments under their own name, while marketing lower grade instruments variously under the Evette & Schaeffer and Evette brands. During the 1930s BC began outsourcing Evette & Schaeffer instruments to other manufacturers.

In 1950, BC developed its famous R13 clarinet, an extremely popular professional-level clarinet. The company also began production of the Dynaction model saxophones that year, which would evolve into the Super Dynaction (1957) and the highly regarded S series (1973) models. Buffet also became the leading distributor of student-grade instruments in Europe, marketing French and Italian made saxophones under their Evette & Schaeffer brand. During the late 1970s and 1980s, the company's position in the student saxophone market collapsed in the face of competition from Yamaha, who offered higher quality and more up-to-date instruments, and lower cost East German, Czech, and Asian manufacturers. Their collapse in the student market accompanied a deteriorating position in the market for professional saxophones.  Buffet left the saxophone market in the mid-1980s. In 2008 Buffet re-entered the saxophone market with their 400 model, sourced from China.

In 1981, BC joined Boosey & Hawkes, which sold the French company to The Music Group in 2003. Two years later BC was bought by a French group
and was given the company name BUFFET Group Wind Instruments SAS, but continues to sell its products under the Buffet Crampon brand.

In 2006 Buffet Group acquired two brass instrument manufacturers, Antoine Courtois Paris and Besson. In 2008 Buffet Group acquired the Leblanc clarinet factory in La Couture-Boussey, Département of Eure, Haute-Normandie in France.

Evette and Evette & Schaeffer clarinets 
Until the 1980s, only professional level clarinets carried the BC name. Lower priced clarinets for the beginner and intermediate market were branded "Evette" and "Evette & Schaeffer", respectively. For a time, the Evette clarinets actually were built by other manufacturers under BC's sponsorship, and these instruments are marked "Evette sponsored by Buffet". By the early 1970s, Buffet was making the Evettes in their own factory in Paris, and around 1979, manufacture was moved to a Buffet-owned factory in Germany. Evette & Schaeffer clarinets were made in Paris. Use of the Evette and Evette & Schaeffer brands ended around 1985, when the company began using the Buffet name on all its clarinets.

2010 to the beginning of 2021 
In 2010 the newly founded Buffet Crampon Deutschland GmbH, Markneukirchen, acquired the production facility in Markneukirchen and the brands W. Schreiber and Julius Keilwerth from the insolvency of Schreiber & Keilwerth GmbH, after the insolvency administrator had reduced the workforce in Markneukirchen from 252 in the previous months Employees had reduced to 134. The company manufactured clarinets of German systems and bassoons under the brand name W. Schreiber and saxophones under the brand name J. Keilwerth. In 2012, BC Germany also takes over B&S GmbH, which also produces in Markneukirchen, the leading European manufacturer of brass instruments with 250 employees and the brands B&S, Hans Hoyer, Melton, Meinl, Weston and J. Scherzer and integrates them into the company, whose workforce will grow to more than 400 employees (470 at the beginning of 2021). With these two most important acquisitions in the company's history, the Buffet Group can almost double its sales and has since taken a leading position not only in the field of woodwind instruments, but also brass instruments.

In 2012,  Capital France SAS becomes shareholder in Buffet Group SAS.  Capital is a subsidiary of Trail, a European private-equity company with registered office in Paris.

In 2014, Jérôme Perrod was appointed as the new CEO of the Buffet Group.

2015 Buffet Group founds a subsidiary in China, the Buffet Crampon Manufacturing Musical Instruments Co. LTD, which is building a production facility for 160 employees in Beijing, where 4,000 brass instruments for students will be (are to be) manufactured annually from 2016 onwards.

With the beginning of 2016 the Buffet Group Wind Instruments SAS was renamed Buffet Crampon SAS (BC).

In January 2019, BC acquired the French oboe manufacturer Rigoutat, Paris.

After the takeover of Powell Flutes in 2016, Parmenon was acquired in June 2019, whose know-how and reputation strengthen the group's competence in the flute market.

2020 BC opens a showroom in Beijing and builds a new factory (BCMMI) for 130 employees near Shanghai, with an annual capacity of 50,000 instruments.

BC is a partner of Woodstock's brass band.

Clarinet models  
The company is most famous for their clarinets, as Buffet is the brand of choice for many professionals.

Buffet Crampon has released several clarinet models from the mid-20th century onwards, with models ranging from student to professional in marketing. The development of new models has sometimes led to the discontinuation of older models. The student models tend to be made from ABS resin, whereas intermediate and professional models are usually made from grenadilla wood. The professional models are usually made from more select grenadilla wood, and are usually unstained. Various options have been made available for select professional models, including the Greenline option, additional keywork, and gold-plated keys.

BC makes more than 400 models of its instruments. Because of the special importance as a manufacturer of clarinets with French system, the current models are listed below.

The following models are currently available (end of 2021) 

Remarks

Student Models

Intermediate

Professional

References

External links 

 
 Jerome Perrod NAMM Oral History Program Interview (2015)
 Buffet Crampon Group. The term "Group" refers to all the companies that include the term "Buffet Crampon" in their company name, i.e. Buffet Crampon SAS in Mantes-la-Ville and its subsidiaries in Germany, China, Japan, the US and the Netherlands.
Brands:

Companies established in 1825
Musical instrument manufacturing companies of France
Clarinet manufacturing companies
Oboe manufacturing companies
French brands